Gary Jordan (unknown – 22 April 2018) was an English professional rugby league footballer who played in the 1960s and 1970s.

Playing career

International honours
Gary Jordan won caps for Great Britain while at Featherstone Rovers in 1964 against France, and in 1967 against Australia.

Challenge Cup Final appearances
Gary Jordan played left-, i.e. number 4, in Featherstone Rovers' 17-12 victory over Barrow in the 1966–67 Challenge Cup Final during the 1966–67 season at Wembley Stadium, London on Saturday 13 May 1967, in front of a crowd of 76,290.

County Cup Final appearances
Gary Jordan played , i.e. number 5, in Featherstone Rovers' 0-10 defeat by Halifax in the 1963–64 Yorkshire County Cup Final during the 1963–64 season at Belle Vue, Wakefield on Saturday 2 November 1963, and played right-, i.e. number 3, in the 9-12 defeat by Hull F.C. in the 1969–70 Yorkshire County Cup Final during the 1969–70 season at Headingley Rugby Stadium, Leeds on Saturday 20 September 1969.

Club career
Gary Jordan made his début for Featherstone Rovers on Saturday 19 August 1961, and he played his last match for Featherstone Rovers during the 1969–70 season.

References

External links
!Great Britain Statistics at englandrl.co.uk (statistics currently missing due to not having appeared for both Great Britain, and England)

1940s births
2018 deaths
Castleford Tigers players
English rugby league players
Featherstone Rovers players
Great Britain national rugby league team players
Place of birth missing
Place of death missing
Rugby league centres
Rugby league wingers
Year of birth missing